The 2013 Royal Trophy was the seventh edition of the Royal Trophy, a team golf event contested between teams representing Asia and Europe. It was held from 20 to 22 December at the Dragon Lake Golf Club in Guangzhou, China. Europe won the event by a score of 8½ to 7½. They won five of the last six singles matches and halved the other for the victory.

Teams

Schedule
20 December (Friday) Foursomes x 4
21 December (Saturday) Four-ball x 4
22 December (Sunday) Singles x 8

Friday's matches (foursomes)

Saturday's matches (four-ball)

Sunday's matches (singles)

References

External links
Official site

Royal Trophy
Golf tournaments in China
Royal Trophy
Royal Trophy